Phoebe Harriet Dynevor (born 17 April 1995) is an English actress. Dynevor is best known for her role as Daphne, the fourth Bridgerton child, in the Netflix period drama Bridgerton (2020–2022).

She began her career as a child actress in the BBC One school drama Waterloo Road (2009–2010). She went on to have recurring roles in the BBC series Prisoners' Wives (2012–2013) and Dickensian (2015–2016), and the TV Land comedy-drama Younger (2017–2021), as well as a main role in the Crackle crime series Snatch (2017–2018).

Early life and education
Phoebe Harriet Dynevor was born on 17 April 1995 in the Trafford district of Manchester, to Emmerdale screenwriter Tim Dynevor and actress Sally Dynevor, who is widely known for her long-running role as Sally Webster on Coronation Street. Her paternal grandparents also worked in the television industry, meeting while members of the company at Joan Littlewood's Theatre Workshop. She has two younger siblings, brother Samuel and sister Harriet. 

Dynevor was educated at Oakfield Nursery School in Altrincham, and then at Cheadle Hulme School in Stockport, where she gained an A and two Bs in her A Levels while working as a child actor alongside her studies.

Career

Beginnings (2009–2019) 
In 2009, 14-year-old Dynevor landed her first role as Siobhan Mailey in the fifth series of Waterloo Road. Later, she made appearances in several British dramas such as Monroe and The Musketeers. She then had a supporting role in BBC drama Prisoners' Wives as a gangster's daughter Lauren. In 2014, she appeared in the second series of The Village and from 2015 to 2016 she played Martha Cratchit in Dickensian.

In 2016, it was announced Dynevor would be starring alongside Luke Pasqualino and Rupert Grint in Crackle crime comedy series Snatch, making her American television debut. The series was released on 16 March 2017 and was later renewed for a second season. In 2017, Dynevor joined the cast of the TV Land comedy-drama series Younger in the recurring role of Clare, Josh's (Nico Tortorella) Irish fiancée.

Breakthrough (2020–present) 
In 2019, Dynevor was cast as Daphne Bridgerton, the lead character in the first season of the Shonda Rhimes-produced Netflix period drama Bridgerton based on the Regency romance novel The Duke and I, which premiered in December 2020. She reprised her role in the show's second season in 2022 as part of the supporting cast, now as Daphne Basset following the character's marriage. Dynevor confirmed in January 2023 that she would not appear in season 3, but left the door open for a future return.

Dynevor made her feature film debut as the ceramicist Clarice Cliff in the 2021 biographical film The Colour Room, directed by Claire McCarthy for Sky Cinema. In April 2022, Dynevor guest starred as a fictional version of herself in an episode of the British Call My Agent! remake, titled Ten Percent on Amazon Prime. In January 2023, Dynevor starred in the Netflix biographical film Bank of Dave alongside Rory Kinnear, and opposite Alden Ehrenreich in the thriller film Fair Play, which opened at the Sundance Film Festival to critical acclaim.

Upcoming projects 
Dynevor is set to star in the Sony Pictures thriller film I Heart Murder directed by Matt Spicer. In addition, Dynevor will executive produce and star in a film adaptation of the Jonathan Stroud novel The Outlaws Scarlett and Browne, and a television adaptation of Naoise Dolan's novel Exciting Times for Amazon Prime. She also has upcoming roles in the romantic comedy The Threesome opposite Logan Lerman, the spy thriller Inheritance with Rhys Ifans, and the psychological thriller Wichita Libra.

Personal life
Dynevor is ambassador for ActionAid UK, an organisation that raises awareness for women and girls living in poverty around the world. She practises a transcendental meditation programme, as taught by Maharishi Mahesh Yogi, daily.

Filmography

Film

Television

Awards and nominations

References

External links
 
 Phoebe Dynevor at Spotlight

Living people
1995 births
21st-century English actresses
Actresses from Greater Manchester
English child actresses
English people of Irish descent
English people of Welsh descent
English television actresses
People educated at Cheadle Hulme School
People from Trafford (district)